Kimmage is a surname. Notable people with the surname include:

 Kevin Kimmage (born 1967), Irish road bicycle racer, brother of Paul
 Paul Kimmage (born 1962), Irish sports journalist and former professional road bicycle racer